Jamalkeh (also Romanized as Jamālkeh; also known as Jamalgah and Jamālika) is a village in Amanabad Rural District, in the Central District of Arak County, Markazi Province, Iran. At the 2006 census, its population was 16, in 8 families.

References 

Populated places in Arak County